Bluefin or Blue Fin and variants may refer to:

Fish
 Bluefin tuna, multiple species of tuna
 Bluefin damsel (Neoglyphidodon melas), damselfish
 Bluefin driftfish (Psenes pellucidus)
 Bluefin gurnard (Chelidonichthys kumu), fish in the sea robin family
 Bluefin stoneroller (Campostoma pauciradii), fish in the family Cyprinidae
 Bluefin trevally (Caranx melampygus), marine fish in the jack family
 False bluefin trevally (Carangoides orthogrammus), fish in the jack family

Other uses
 Blue Fin, a 1978 Australian family movie
 Bluefin Robotics, a maker of autonomous underwater vehicles
 Bluefin-21, an underwater vehicle used in the Malaysia Airlines Flight 370 search
 Bluefin Labs, Massachusetts television analytics company
 New York Bluefins, a professional ice hockey team based in New York in the Federal Hockey League (2010–2013)
 MV Blue Fin, a cargo ship built in 1945 and sunk in 1965

See also